Helter Skelter or Helter-skelter may refer to:

Arts, media, and entertainment

Film
 Helter Skelter (1949 film), a British romantic comedy
 Helter Skelter (1976 film)
 Helter Skelter (2004 film)
 Helter Skelter (2012 film), a Japanese psychological drama based on the manga

Literature 
 Helter Skelter (manga), a series by Kyoko Okazaki
 "Helter Skelter", a 1731 poem and story by Jonathan Swift

Music

Albums 
 Helter Skelter (Fred Frith and François-Michel Pesenti album), 1992
 Helter Skelter (The D.O.C. album), 1996

Songs 
 "Helter Skelter" (song), by the Beatles, written by Lennon-McCartney, covered by many other artists and the inspiration for Charles Manson's adoption of the term
 "Helter Skelter", a cover by Siouxsie and the Banshees on their album The Scream
 "Helter Skelter", a cover by Rob Zombie and Marilyn Manson
 "Helter Skelter", a song on the Edge of Sanity album Infernal
 "Helter Skelter", a song by Skrew
 "Helter Skelter", a march by the Royal Engineers
 "Helter Skelter", a house music single by Shapeshifters
 "Healter Skelter", a song by Shining
 "Helter Skelter", a song by Meat Beat Manifesto
 "Helter Skelter", an electronic song by Tom Swoon and Maximals
 "Helter Skelter", a song by Alkaline
 "Healter Skelter", a song by Samael

Television 
 "Helter Skelter", the pilot episode of the TV series American Horror Story
 "Helter Skelter" (2012), a season 7 episode of the TV series Dexter
 "Helter Skelter", an episode of the TV series Eureka Seven
 "Helter Skelter" (2007), a season 3 episode of Instant Star, a Canadian TV series
 "Helter Skelter", an episode of the Terror in Resonance anime series
 Helter Skelter: An American Myth, a 2020 documentary miniseries on Epix

Video gaming 
 Helter Skelter (1989), a computer game developed by The Assembly Line
 "Helter Skelter", a track in the 1999 video game R4: Ridge Racer Type 4
 Helter Skelter, a character in the 2008 video game No More Heroes
 Helter Skelter, a weapon in the 2010 video game Final Fantasy XIII

Other arts, entertainment, and media 
 Helter Skelter I, a painting by Mark Bradford

Charles Manson 
 Helter Skelter (scenario), a race war prophecy said to have inspired the Tate–LaBianca murders
 Helter Skelter (book), 1974, by Vincent Bugliosi about the murders
 Helter Skelter (1976 film), first adaptation of the book
 Helter Skelter (2004 film), later adaptation

Other uses 
 Helter Skelter (rave music promoter)
 Helter skelter (ride), an amusement park ride
 Helter Skelter Publishing, a London, England music bookshop and publisher

See also 
 Helter Shelter (disambiguation)
 Helta Skelta, an album by Turbonegro
 Heltah Skeltah, a hip hop duo
 Skelter Films, a fictional company in the movie The Racketeer